Cardiff Heights is a suburb of the City of Lake Macquarie, Greater Newcastle, New South Wales, Australia.

References

External links
 History of Cardiff Heights (Lake Macquarie City Library)
 NHS

Suburbs of Lake Macquarie